Manhattan Place is a 35-story apartment building at 630 First Avenue in the Murray Hill neighborhood of Manhattan in New York City. Opened in 1984, it was one of the city's first high-rise condominiums and the first project in the city for which Costas Kondylis received credit as the design architect.

History 
The building, developed by The Glick Organization, is located on the east side of First Avenue between 36th and 37th streets on a  site. Previously occupied by a Texaco gas station and a warehouse, the site took three years to acquire and rezone. Negotiations with the New York City Planning Commission and Manhattan Community Board 6 during the planning process resulted in a shifting of the building's orientation so that its street level landscaped plaza would face St. Vartan Park. Groundbreaking took place in 1983.

Designed by architect Costas Kondylis of Philip Birnbaum & Associates, Manhattan Place was one of New York City's first high-rise condominiums and also one of the first residential buildings in the city at that time to focus on luxury design. The 35-story structure contains 487 residential units with ground-level retail along the First Avenue frontage. Its residential tower is a triangular-ended rectangle oriented diagonally to face the northeast and southwest, maximizing the building's unobstructed views of the East River and the Manhattan skyline across St. Vartan Park and the entrance to the Queens–Midtown Tunnel. Several sets of bay windows run along the length of the building, which has a façade consisting of horizontal ribbons of glass and brick. Manhattan Place includes a  rooftop health club with a pool, gym, indoor jogging track, and lounge. When asked about the selection of the building's name, Jeffrey Glick of The Glick Organization said "I wanted 'Manhattan' because Manhattan is the best place to live."

Manhattan Place was Kondylis' first success story and his first project in New York City for which he received credit as the design architect. The building caught the attention of Donald Trump, who partnered with Kondylis on the design of other buildings in Manhattan including the Trump World Tower, Trump International Hotel and Tower, and several buildings in Riverside South.

In popular culture 
 In the 1984 drama movie Falling in Love, Manhattan Place is shown in several scenes as the construction site that Frank is working at. 
 Manhattan Place is depicted as the Rutherford Hotel in the Honor Among Thieves episode in the fourth season of the TV series Person of Interest (originally aired on November 11, 2014).
 The rooftop of Manhattan Place was the filming location for a coffee break taken by Dr. Goodwin and Dr. Sharpe on top of Bellevue Hospital in the Rituals episode in the first season of the TV series New Amsterdam (originally aired on October 2, 2018).

References

External links 
Emporis profile

1984 establishments in New York City
Apartment buildings in New York City
Murray Hill, Manhattan
Residential skyscrapers in Manhattan